This article lists countries alphabetically, with total government expenditure as percentage of Gross domestic product (GDP) for the listed countries. Also stated is the government revenue and net lending/borrowing of the government as percentage of GDP. All Data is based on the World Economic Outlook Databook of the International Monetary Fund.

List of countries (2020) 
The figures here are represented as a percentage of annual gross domestic product for the year 2020.

Historical Development 
Development of government spending as percentage of GDP of different countries.

See also 

 List of countries by government budget
 List of countries by government budget per capita
 List of countries by tax revenue to GDP ratio

Europe:

 List of sovereign states in Europe by budget revenues
 List of sovereign states in Europe by budget revenues per capita

United States:

 List of U.S. state budgets

References 

government spending as percentage of GDP